Kasou Taishou (Kinchan and Katori Shingo's All Japan Costume Grand Prix, internationally known as Masquerade) is a semi-annual Japanese television variety show that is run on Nippon TV and first aired in 1979.

The program shows in which various amateur groups (or solo artists) perform short skits, which are rated by a panel of judges. Especially in recent years, many of the skits have revolved around clever methods of "faking" cinematic special effects on a live stage. The show is hosted by Kinichi Hagimoto and Shingo Katori. Worldwide, the most famous of these skits, and among the most successful at "fake special effects" was a skit which is widely known as "Matrix ping pong".

On the 98th edition (February 6, 2021) of the program, Kinichi Hagimoto announced that this would be the last time that he will present the program.

Matrix ping pong
Matrix Ping Pong is the name of a popular movie clip from the show featuring performers playing ping pong with moves in the style of The Matrix, using kurokos—stagehands in kabuki theatre—to hold the props up, facilitating humorous and otherwise impossible movements. Most of the elements in the performance are set against black to visibly obscure the stagehands. This performance, led by team captain Hideki Kajiwara, won the competition on March 31, 2003. The clip became an internet meme.

International broadcast 
The show is also aired internationally in some countries. Hong Kong airs this programme under the name of "全民創意爭霸賽" on the i-CABLE Entertainment Channel with Cantonese dubbing, while in Taiwan it was aired under the name "超級變變變". Indonesia, Malaysia and Singapore on the other hand airs it under the name of Masquerade. The Indonesian and Singaporean broadcasts under this title are aired dubbed, on MNCTV in Indonesian and MediaCorp okto in English respectively, whereas the Malaysian broadcast on TV3 is aired with Malay subtitles. Southeast Asia also airs it as Masquerade (year) on Sony Gem TV aired every Christmas Day.

In the Philippines, the version of the show airs on GMA Network as part of Bilib Ka Ba Nights block of the network under the name of Masquerade and hosted by Ariel Villasanta and Maverick Relova, it ran from August 20, 2008 until March 11, 2009.

In other popular culture 
The show was featured in the music video for the 2004 single "Flamboyant" by British pop-duo Pet Shop Boys. Directed by Nico Beyer, the music video follows one of the real participants of the show that eventually goes on to win the competition with their recreation of billiards.

References

External links
Official "Kinchan and Katori Shingo's All Japan Costume Grand Prix" homepage (in Japanese)

Japanese variety television shows
Nippon TV original programming
1979 Japanese television series debuts
1970s Japanese television series
1980s Japanese television series
1990s Japanese television series
2000s Japanese television series
2010s Japanese television series
Japanese television specials